The Europe/Africa Zone was one of three Zones of Davis Cup competition in 2003.

Group I

Group II

Monaco, Ghana, Ivory Coast, and Andorra relegated to Group III in 2004.
South Africa and Greece promoted to Group I in 2004.

Group III

Venue I
Participating Teams
  — promoted to Group II in 2004
  — relegated to Group IV in 2004
  — relegated to Group IV in 2004
 
  — promoted to Group II in 2004

Venue II
Participating Teams
 
  — relegated to Group IV in 2004
 
  — promoted to Group II in 2004
  — promoted to Group II in 2004
 
  — relegated to Group IV in 2004

Group IV

Venue I
Participating Teams
  — promoted to Group III in 2004
  — promoted to Group III in 2004

Venue II
Participating Teams
  — promoted to Group III in 2004
 
 
 
 
 
 
 
  — promoted to Group III in 2004

See also
Davis Cup structure

 
Europe Africa
Davis Cup Europe/Africa Zone